Once Upon a Time in High School: The Spirit of Jeet Kune Do is a 2004 South Korean drama film. The background of the film is set in a high school in South Korea, 1978. The original Korean title literally means "cruel history of Maljuk street" and one of the filming locations was the present neighborhood of Yangjae-dong, Seocho District in Seoul.

Synopsis 
Hyun-soo (Kwon Sang-woo), transfers to a school that is notorious for its poor outcomes and brutality. He joins a bottom-rank class and experiences violence by delinquents led by Jong-hoon (Lee Jong-hyuk), a stereotypical Korean bully. The teachers are depicted as authoritarian and brutal (as was common up into the 1970s). On the bus, Hyun-soo sees and falls in love with Eun-joo (Han Ga-in). When schoolboys start teasing her, Hyun-soo takes the opportunity to gain her respect, even though it starts a riot. After the two are chased and caught in their hiding place, one of Hyun-soo's friends Kim Woo-sik (Lee Jung-jin), steps in and knocks out the attackers.

A love triangle is formed between Hyun-soo, Woo-sik, and Eun-joo. One day, Hyun-soo notices Woo-sik and Eun-joo arguing. Despite his only achievement being sharing an umbrella with her, he meets her on a rooftop that night and they bond with each other while Woo-sik jealously observes them in secret. One day Hyun-soo and Woo-sik get in a fight over Eun-joo and their friendship ends. Woo-sik then humiliates and beats up Ham Jye-bok or "Hamburger" (Park Hyo-jun) who sells pornography to other students. Woo-sik then loses an intense fight with Jong-hoon on the rooftop and leaves the school, presumably having dropped out.

Hyun-soo concludes that Eun-joo has left him for Woo-sik. Hyun-soo's father is a black belt in Tae Kwon Do and an owner of a Tae Kwon Do gym; he treats his students kindly while treats his son poorly. When he discovers that Hyun-soo has been receiving poor grades, he beats him, refers to him as "surplus man" (a derogatory term for a person without a future), and kicks him out of his house permanently.

No longer able to put up with the conduct of Jong-hoon, his gang, nor the brutality and violence of teachers, Hyun-soo trains himself in Jeet Kune Do, inspired by his childhood hero Bruce Lee. One day, on the same rooftop where Woo-sik lost his fight with Jong-hoon, Hyun-soo uses nunchaku and his new-found expertise in Jeet Kune Do to grievously injure Jong-hoon and his gang mates. When authorities blame Hyun-soo, he lashes out. Smashing windows and throwing his nunchucks, he curses Korea's entire education system for being so corrupt and encouraging brutality.

Hyun-soo is expelled and sent to a public school. Jong-hoon's mother blames him for beating her son, forcing his father to apologize to her for his son's actions. Hyun-soo apologizes to his father about the incident and they eventually reconcile. His father tells him that he can always get a GED and asks if Bruce Lee went to college, knowing full well that he didn't and realizing that a good man isn't defined by a college education. By chance, he runs into Eun-joo. Hyun-soo later attends a movie with Ham Jye-bok and both goof off with mock martial arts over Bruce Lee vs Jackie Chan.

Cast

Kwon Sang-woo as Hyun-soo 
Kim Dong-young as young Hyun-soo 
Lee Jung-jin as Woo-sik
Han Ga-in as Eun-joo
Kim In-kwon as Jiksae 
Lee Jong-hyuk as Jong-hoon
Park Hyo-jun as Hamburger
Seo Dong-won as Seong-hun
Baek Bong-ki as Cheetah
Kim Byeong-chun as drill teacher
Yang Han-seok as P.E. teacher 
Ahn Nae-sang as Math teacher
Lee Jin-wook as Jiksae's friend 2
Park Jin-tae
Kim Bu-seon
Chun Ho-jin as Hyun-soo's father
Kim Young-im
Choi Jae-hwan
Kim Su-nam
Lee Yu-soo
Kwon Tae-won as English teacher
Jung Jae-jin
Lee Sook
Cho Jin-woong as gang member
Lee Hyeon-seok as Hyun-soo's mother
Jeon Sung-ae as Jong-hoon's mother
Park Soo-young as Politics & Economics teacher
Choi Woong as dance club guard 3
Jeon Jin-woo as tteokbokki restaurant disc jockey

Awards and nominations
2004 Baeksang Arts Awards
 Most Popular Actor - Kwon Sang-woo
 Nomination - Best Actor - Kwon Sang-woo

2004 Grand Bell Awards
 Popularity Award - Kwon Sang-woo
 Nomination - Best Original Screenplay - Yoo Ha

2004 Blue Dragon Film Awards
 Best Art Direction - Kim Gi-cheol, Kim Hyo-jeong
 Popular Star Award - Kwon Sang-woo
 Nomination - Best Film
 Nomination - Best Director - Yoo Ha
 Nomination - Best Screenplay - Yoo Ha
 Nomination - Best Cinematography - Choi Hyeon-gi
 Nomination - Best New Actress - Han Ga-in

2004 Korean Film Awards
 Nomination - Best Film
 Nomination - Best Director - Yoo Ha
 Nomination - Best Screenplay - Yoo Ha
 Nomination - Best New Actress - Han Ga-in

References

External links 
 
 
 
 
 

2004 films
2004 action drama films
South Korean action drama films
South Korean teen films
2000s teen drama films
Self-reflexive films
Films about school violence
Films set in 1978
Films set in Seoul
Films directed by Yoo Ha
2000s Korean-language films
2000s South Korean films